Guy Coombe is a South African former rugby league footballer who represented South Africa at the 1995 World Cup, playing in all three matches in which they were involved.

In 1996 he spent the season at the Dewsbury Rams, along with several other South African World Cup players. Despite the hype surrounding their arrival, the imports failed to make a lasting impression at the club and returned home the following year.

He has a wife, 2 sons and a daughter.

References

Living people
South African rugby league players
South Africa national rugby league team players
Dewsbury Rams players
Rugby league wingers
Place of birth missing (living people)
Date of birth missing (living people)
South African expatriate rugby league players
Expatriate rugby league players in England
South African expatriate sportspeople in England
Year of birth missing (living people)